Indian bread root is a common name for several plants with edible roots and may refer to:

Psoralea esculenta, a legume native to the Great Plains
Zamia integrifolia, a cycad native to the southeastern United States and the Caribbean